Jim Nelson (born March 8, 1963) is an American journalist, known for his tenure as editor-in-chief of the magazine GQ.

Early career
Nelson began his journalism career in television, first working as a producer and writer at CNN and later moving to Hollywood where he worked briefly as a writer's assistant on television sitcoms.

He made the shift to magazines at age thirty, starting with an internship at Harper's Magazine, from 1994 to 1997 Nelson was an editor at Harper’s Magazine under Lewis Lapham, where he was responsible for the magazine's Readings section. His writing has also appeared in The New York Times Magazine, Gourmet, and Food & Wine. His own writing for GQ was cited in The Best American Sports Writing in 2001.

GQ
Nelson is the former editor-in-chief of GQ, a position he held from 2003-2018. Nelson joined the magazine as a senior editor in 1997, editing the work of such writers as Andrew Corsello, Elizabeth Gilbert, Charles Bowden, and Michael Paterniti. After working under Art Cooper as an executive editor, Nelson was appointed by Condé Nast to replace him as editor-in-chief in 2003.

Over the course of Nelson's 15 years at the helm, the magazine has been nominated for sixty-four National Magazine Awards and has won for reporting, design, photography, general excellence, the highest honor in the industry, as well as twice in the feature writing category. The November 2017 cover of GQ featuring LeBron James won Best Sports and Fitness cover. The 2017 Men of the Year cover featuring Colin Kaepernick as Citizen of Year won the Reader's Choice for Most Controversial cover. In 2018, Rachel Kaadzi Ghansah's feature, A Most American Terrorist: The Making of Dylann Roof, which appeared in the September 2017 issue of GQ, won a Pulitzer Prize for Feature Writing. 
 
GQ has been nominated for forty-three James Beard Awards and has won for restaurant reviews and critiques, distinguished food writing, writing on wine spirits or beer, and humor. In 2016 The Daily Front Row's fourth annual Fashion and Media Awards honored Jim Nelson with the Magazine of the Year award for GQ. In 2017 Ad Age named GQ a magazine of the year honoree. Adweek also named GQ "hottest men's magazine" in 2017. 
 
In 2016, Nelson launched ‘The Closer with Keith Olbermann,’ a twice-weekly web series offering political commentary on the 2016 election and other timely news topics. After garnering more than 75 million views for ‘The Closer,’ Olbermann returned with a post-election series on GQ.com called ‘The Resistance’ where he continued the conversation about President Trump. The series ended in 2017.

Additionally, during Nelson's time at the magazine, a number of GQ stories have become both small and large-scale film productions and TV series, including Concussion starring Will Smith, the Netflix series Last Chance U and the film Only the Brave. In 2017, NBC optioned a sitcom based on GQ editor Dan Riley's feature, Inside the Church of Chili’s. GQ's webseries, Most Expensivest, was also sold to Viceland.

In 2017, Nelson was tapped to host an episode of the PBS icon series, Speakeasy, in which he interviewed punk rock legend, Nick Lowe. He also spoke at length on the evolution of GQ and the enduring importance of long-form journalism on the Longform Podcast.

Nelson resigned in 2018 and was succeeded by Will Welch.

Personal life
Nelson graduated from the University of Notre Dame with a B.A. in American Studies. He resides in Brooklyn with his partner, John Mario Sevilla, a dancer and choreographer.

See also
 Editorial board
 Fashion editor
 LGBT culture in New York City
 List of LGBT people from New York City
 Literature review
 New Yorkers in journalism

References

External links
 
 
 
 Sandomir, Richard (October 23, 2016). Now at GQ, Keith Olbermann Takes His Outrage Online. The New York Times.
 Donnelly, Matt (October 20, 2017). How ‘Only the Brave’ Went From Magazine Pages to the Multiplex. The Wrap.

People from Greenbelt, Maryland
American magazine editors
American television editors
Living people
1963 births
LGBT people from Maryland
GQ (magazine)